The South Cheshire Way is a  long-distance footpath running east–west mainly through Cheshire, England, though parts lie in Shropshire and Staffordshire. The western section from Grindley Brook, near Whitchurch, runs through farmland; the eastern section from Mow Cop, near Biddulph, runs through low hills. The footpath is waymarked with black and yellow discs inscribed 'SCW'.

The path connects with several other long-distance paths, including the Maelor Way, the Staffordshire Way and the Sandstone and Gritstone Trails.

See also

Recreational walks in Cheshire

Further reading
Grindley Brook to Mow Cop and Mow Cop to Grindley Brook guides, Mid-Cheshire Footpath Society

External links
The South Cheshire Way
Cheshire County Council
Ramblers' Association

Footpaths in Cheshire
Long-distance footpaths in England
Footpaths in Shropshire
Footpaths in Staffordshire
Cheshire, South